James Lorimer Ilsley,  (January 3, 1894 – January 14, 1967) was a Canadian politician and jurist.

He was born in Somerset, Nova Scotia, the son of Randel Ilsley and Catherine Caldwell. Ilsley was educated at Acadia University and Dalhousie University and was admitted to the Nova Scotia bar in 1916. In 1919, he married Evelyn Smith. Ilsley practised law in Yarmouth and Halifax, Nova Scotia until he was elected to the House of Commons of Canada as a Liberal in the 1926 election. He survived the 1930 election that sent the Liberals into Opposition.

When the party returned to power in the 1935 election, Prime Minister William Lyon Mackenzie King brought Ilsley into Cabinet as Minister of National Revenue. In 1940, he was promoted to  Minister of Finance. He held that position for the duration of World War II during a period of massive expansion in expenditure due to the war effort, described as a "transformation of the Canadian tax system" by historian Colin Campbell.  Under his direction, the minimum income required to pay income tax was push dramatically downward, effectively changing income tax from a "class tax" on the wealthiest 300,000 or so Canadians to a national tax imposed on millions of average workers, and directly deduced from their checks.  The revenue generated from income tax during this era expand by nearly 1000%. He also led the Victory Bond campaign, brought in wage and price controls in 1941, and deal with several currency crises. He was also known for his call for personal sacrifice by civilians during the war and led by example by giving up his car and riding the streetcar to Parliament Hill. In 1945, despite the taxes he had imposed on the general public, he was rated the most popular cabinet minister in the cabinet.

He was recognized for his service in 1946 when he was appointed to the Imperial Privy Council, and given the honorific of "Right Honourable".

The same year, he became Minister of Justice. He served in that position until he retired from politics in 1948. The next year, he was appointed to the Nova Scotia Supreme Court and became Chief Justice of Nova Scotia in 1950. He served in that capacity until his death in 1967 in Halifax at the age of 73.

J. L. Ilsley High School, opened in 1971 and located in Spryfield, Nova Scotia, bears his name.

Electoral record

References

External links 

 

1894 births
1967 deaths
Canadian Ministers of Finance
Members of the House of Commons of Canada from Nova Scotia
Liberal Party of Canada MPs
Members of the King's Privy Council for Canada
Canadian members of the Privy Council of the United Kingdom
Lawyers in Nova Scotia
Canadian King's Counsel
People from Lunenburg County, Nova Scotia